The Couler Valley is a valley near Dubuque, Iowa and has the Bee Branch Creek, previously known as the Couler Creek, located in it. It is found in the Driftless Area.

Etymology 
The name Couler has unknown meanings, however it could originate from the French  or "to cast." Previously, the lower section went by Langworthy Hollow.

History 
It has been interpreted that the Little Maquoketa River used to flow through the Couler Valley.

Mining started in the valley in 1788 when Julien Dubuque befriended the Fox Indians. Most of the Couler Valley was included in the land grant to Dubuque by the Spanish Empire. After Dubuque's death, the Indians took over mining and exported lead to white settlers who had a furnace on a Mississippian Island. In 1833, settling was permitted west of the Mississippi and mining was resumed by settlers.

Geography 
It is drained southeastwardly by the Bee Branch. During high floods, the Little Maquoketa River can also occupy parts of the valley.

Geology 
The ore district around the Couler Valley has large amounts of zinc and lead. Those minerals were mined extensively in the 19th century. The lithology of the surface consists of loess and residuum.

References 

Dubuque, Iowa
Canyons and gorges of Iowa